Sadashivanagara (Kannada: ಸದಾಶಿವನಗರ) is an affluent residential neighbourhood in Bangalore in the Indian state of Karnataka. The neighbourhood houses plush homes and mansions of several famous celebrities, businessmen and politicians.

History
Sadashivanagar was created out of the former royal gardens, and is home to one of the original four towers built in 1597 by Kempe Gowda I, the founder of the city.

In the 1960s and early 1970s, the gardens of the Bangalore Palace (a summer home of the Wodeyar dynasty of Mysore) were converted into a residential neighborhood, and this was when the first lots in Sadashivnagar were purchased. Until the 1990s, Sadashivnagar was known as "Palace Orchards," as it was built in the former royal grounds. It was renamed in honor of Karnad Sadashiva Rao, a freedom fighter and philanthropist.

Even today, homes in the Raj Mahal Vilas Extension (built in the wing formerly known as Upper Palace Orchards) are situated right opposite what is left of the official palace grounds. Many highly placed government officials, ex-governors, film stars and millionaire businessmen have bought homes in the neighborhood. The neighborhood is also home to various Wodeyar royals.

Culture
Along with the adjacent older, neighborhood of Malleswaram, the atmosphere in Sadashivanagar is Old Bangalore and therefore somewhat different from Bangalore's customary stereotype as a young, modern, and contemporary city. The majority of the residents come from old families and try to preserve tradition and heritage. Until the mid-2000s, it was the custom in Sadashivanagar to shun ostentatious displays of wealth and cultivate unassuming, modest manners. This culture is typical of old Bangalore society.

However, such qualities are slowly changing as new families from different backgrounds move into the neighborhood.

Present boundary
The Sadashivanagar area runs from Mehkri Circle in the north to Bashyam Circle a little way south. A less expensive area once known as Lower Palace Orchards spills over and partially surrounds the Bashyam Circle. Sadashivanagar borders the Sankey Tank, a midsized lake on the edge of which are several large homes. A trail runs along the circumference of the lake and is sometimes used by residents for exercise.

To reduce pollution of the natural water bodies, the Civic Authority has constructed an artificial tank for immersion of Ganesha during the famous Ganesha Chathurthi festival. There are also a few small parks in Sadashivanagar.

Noteworthy residents:

 swaroop kanchi (Noted Film actor, Director and author)

 M. Nagappa Reddy (Bangalore Jail, Gowribidanur Sugar Factory, GKVK Main Building)
 D. K. Shivakumar - Energy Minister of Karnataka (Congress)
 K C Reddy - Karnatakas First Chief Minister
 Basappa Danappa Jatti - former President of India
 Ramakrishna Hegde - former Chief Minister of Karnataka and former Union Minister of Commerce and Industry
 Veerendra Patil - twice former Chief Minister of Karnataka
 M. Rajasekara Murthy - former union minister, Lingayat/Veerashiva Political Chief, Former finance/revenue/excise/industries minister
 S.M. Krishna - former Chief Minister of Karnataka, former Governor of Maharashtra, former Union Minister of External Affairs
 Dharam Singh - former Chief Minister of Karnataka
 D. Devaraj Urs - twice former Chief Minister of Karnataka
 Bangarappa - former Chief Minister of Karnataka
 Kumar Bangarappa - MLA, Former Minister Govt. of Karnataka, 
 H. D. Deve Gowda former Chief Minister of Karnataka and former Prime Minister of India
 [M. NageswaraRao] - former managing director and Finance Director, (one of the company's first leaders) Hindustan Machine Tools 
 Mallikarjun Kharge - Union Minister of Labour and Employment
 Kengal Hanumanthaiah - Chief Minister of Mysore State (before Karnataka was formed)
 Raghavendra Rajkumar - Kannada actor and producer
 Bhogaraju Ramana Rao - celebrity physician, awarded the Padma Shri in 2010.
 Rajkumar -  Kannada actor
 Puneeth Rajkumar - Kannada actor, singer and television presenter
 V. G. Siddhartha - founder and chairman of Café Coffee Day
 V.L. Patil - former Revenue Minister, Social welfare Minister, Transport & Labour, Industry, Horticulture and Member of Parliament.
 B.R. Gurudev - former MLA and MLC from Sakleshpur
Krishna Devaraya-Present scion of the Aravidu dynasty and Maharaja of the Vijaynagar empire.

Neighbourhoods in Bangalore